Yuracaré may refer to:
 Yuracaré people, an ethnic group of Bolivia
 Yuracaré language, their language

Language and nationality disambiguation pages